known outside Japan as Sugar Princess is a manga series by Shosuke Kurakane. The original manga was serialized between 1949 and 1955. In 1986, Izumi Takemoto retold the original manga series, releasing it under the same title and simultaneously with the anime adaptation.

Plot
Anmitsu is a beautiful princess living happily at the Amakara Castle. The only thing is that she is a tomboy and doesn't act very ladylike. When Anmitsu turns ten years old, her parents present her with a tutor named Castella, who's from the Pudding Kingdom, in hopes of getting Anmitsu more serious about being a princess. Nonetheless, Anmitsu is still up to her usual antics and frequently escapes from the castle to have fun. However, she learns many things about the world outside the castle and about life in general in her adventures. She also makes new friends and continues to cause trouble for the royalty in Amakara Castle.

Media

Manga
The manga was published in Kobunsha's Shōjo magazine from 1949 to 1955. The series helped boost the magazine's circulation to 700,000 copies. It was one of the most popular manga of the early 1950s.

Live-action adaptations
The first adaptations of Anmitsu Hime came in 1954 with two films. Both starred Izumi Yukimura as Anmitsu Hime. Another film was made in 1960, but with an entirely new staff and cast, starring Haruko Wanibuchi as Animtsu Hime.

Live-action television dramas
 The first TV drama series was broadcast in 1958–1960, featuring Misao Nakahara as Princess Anmitsu.
 The second TV drama series was broadcast in 1983–1984, featuring Kyōko Koizumi as Princess Anmitsu.
 The third TV drama mini-series was broadcast in 2008 and 2009 in the form of two television specials. They feature Mao Inoue as Princess Anmitsu.

Anime television series
An anime adaptation, called Anmitsu Hime: From Amakara Castle was made by Studio Pierrot and produced by Tatsunoko Productions, aired on Fuji TV from October 5, 1986, to September 27, 1987, for a 51-episode run. The broadcast time is from 18:00 to 18:30 on Sunday, it is the time zone which is assigned to "Chibi Maruko-chan" since 1990.

The series is about a tomboy princess in the late Edo-period world, but with modern-day technology. This anime is tied up with the "Dream Factory" and "Sunset Meow Meow" that were planned by Fuji TV at that time, stories of Princess Anmitsu visiting the "Dream Factory" appears in this anime, and theme songs are also sung by the Onyanko Club.

Theme songs
Opening theme : Koi wa Question
 Singer : Onyanko Club / Lyricist : Yasushi Akimoto / Composer : Akira Mitake / Arranger : Akira Mitake
Ending theme : 
 Singer : Onyanko Club / Lyricist : Yasushi Akimoto / Composer : Hiro Nagasawa / Arranger : Etsuko Yamakawa

Anime staff
 Director : Masami Annō
 Series composition : Yoshio Urasawa
 Scenario : Yoshio Urasawa, Yoshiyuki Suga
 Character design : Kōji Nanke
 Music : Kan Ogasawara
 Sound director : Fusanobu Fujiyama
 Animation director : Yoshiyuki Kishi
 Art director : Torao Arai
 Producer : Yoshitaki Suzuki (Studio Pierrot), Ryūnosuke Endō (Fuji TV), Kyōtarō Kimura (Yomiuri Advertisement)
 Planning : Kazuo Shimamura (Yomiuri Advertisement)
 Production Desk : Ken Hagino

Anime cast
 Princess Anmitsu : Mami Koyama
 Awanodango no Kami : Takuzō Kamiyama
 Shibucha : Hisako Kyōda
 Hikozaemon Abekawa : Jōji Yanami
 Court Lady Ohagi : Reiko Suzuki
 Kaki no Tanesuke : Shigeru Chiba
 Amaguri no Suke : Yūko Mita
 Manjū : Yuriko Fuchizaki
 Shiomame : Sakurako Hoshino
 Sembei : Tesshō Genda
 Gen'ai Hiraga : Kei Tomiyama
 Narrator : Tomoko Ōno

Video game

A Master System video game based on the series was made, and translated for the Europe, North America and Oceania markets as Alex Kidd in High-Tech World, with the main character replaced with Alex Kidd and other characters and parts of the game slightly edited to fit the change from a female to a male protagonist; where as the goal of Anmitsu Hime is to reach a cake shop in time before it closes, the localized version changes this to a game center.

References

External links
 Anmitsu Hime film list
 Sega Joy Joy news #11 contains info on the game
 Fuji TV page contains info on the 2008 drama 
 Fuji TV page contains info on the 2009 drama 
 

1949 manga
1986 anime television series debuts
1986 manga
Comedy anime and manga
Fantasy anime and manga
Fuji TV original programming
Kodansha manga
Shōjo manga
Pierrot (company)
Onyanko Club
Japanese fantasy comedy films